This is a list of Catholic churches in Canada.

Cathedrals

Basilica of St. John the Baptist
Basilique-Cathédrale Sainte-Cécile
Cathedral of Christ the King (Hamilton)
Cathedral of Saint Peter-in-Chains
Cathedral of the Immaculate Conception (Saint John, New Brunswick)
Co-Cathedral of Saint-Antoine-de-Padoue
Holy Family Cathedral (Saskatoon)
Holy Rosary Cathedral (Vancouver)
Mary, Queen of the World Cathedral
Notre-Dame Basilica-Cathedral (Quebec City)
Notre-Dame Cathedral Basilica, Ottawa
Our Lady of Assumption Co-Cathedral
Sacred Heart Cathedral (Bathurst, New Brunswick)
Sacred Heart Cathedral (Kamloops)
Saint Boniface Cathedral
Saint-François-Xavier Cathedral
Saint-Germain Cathedral
Saint-Jacques Cathedral (Montreal)
Saint-Michel Basilica-Cathedral
St. Andrew's Cathedral (Victoria, British Columbia)
St. Dunstan's Basilica
St. Joseph's Basilica, Edmonton
St. Mary's Basilica, Halifax
St. Mary's Cathedral (Calgary)
St. Mary's Cathedral, Kingston
St. Mary's Cathedral, Winnipeg
St. Michael's Cathedral (Toronto)
St. Paul's Cathedral (Saskatoon)
St. Peter's Cathedral Basilica, London

Basilicas

Basilica of Sainte-Anne-de-Beaupré
Notre-Dame Basilica (Montreal)
Notre-Dame-du-Cap Basilica
Sainte-Anne de Varennes Basilica
Saint Joseph's Oratory
St. Michael's Basilica, Miramichi
St. Patrick's Basilica, Montreal
St. Patrick's Basilica, Ottawa
St. Paul's Basilica (Toronto)

Chapels
Notre-Dame-de-Bon-Secours Chapel

Other churches

Alberta
St. Patrick's Roman Catholic Church (Calgary)

British Columbia
Church of the Holy Cross, Skatin

Newfoundland and Labrador
St. Patrick's Church (St. John's)

Northwest Territories
Church of Our Lady of Good Hope
Our Lady Of Victory Church (Inuvik)

Nova Scotia
Église Sainte-Marie, Church Point, Nova Scotia

Ontario

Blessed Sacrament Catholic Church (Ottawa)
Chinese Martyrs Catholic Church
Church of Our Lady Immaculate, Guelph
Church of the Holy Name, Toronto
Holy Family Roman Catholic Church, Parkdale
Martyrs' Shrine
Our Lady of Lourdes Roman Catholic Church (Toronto)
Our Lady of Sorrows Roman Catholic Church, Kingsway
Our Lady of the Assumption (Windsor, Ontario)
Saint Sylvesters Church
Sacred Heart Kerala Roman Catholic Community-Latin Rite Malayalam Church
Ste-Anne Catholic Church (Ottawa)
St. Clement Catholic Church (Cambridge) 
St. Francis de Sales Roman Catholic Church (Ajax, Ontario)
St. Francis of Assisi, Toronto
St. Joseph (Ottawa)
St. Leo's Roman Catholic Church, Mimico
St. Mary's Church, Toronto
St. Patrick's Church (Toronto)
St. Teresa Roman Catholic Church, New Toronto
St. Theresa's Catholic Church (Ottawa)
St. Vincent de Paul Roman Catholic Church (Toronto)

Prince Edward Island
Immaculate Conception Church (Palmer Road)
St. Brigid's Church, Prince Edward Island
St. Simon & St. Jude Church (Tignish)

Quebec
Church of La Visitation-de-la-Bienheureuse-Vierge-Marie
Church of Nativité-de-la-Sainte-Vierge-d'Hochelaga
Church of St. Michael and St. Anthony
Church of the Madonna della Difesa
Église Sainte-Geneviève (Montreal)
 (Montreal)
Notre-Dame Church (Montreal)
Notre-Dame-des-Victoires, Quebec City
Saint-Ambroise Church
Saint-Arsène Church
Saint-Dominique Church (Quebec City)
Saint-Édouard Church
Saint-Esprit-de-Rosemont Church
Saint-Jean-Baptiste Church (Montreal)
Saint-Jean-Baptiste Church (Quebec City)
Saint-Jean-Berchmans Church
Saint-Joachim de Pointe-Claire Church
Saint-Léon de Westmount Church
Saint-Viateur d'Outremont Church
St. Patrick's Church (Quebec City)

Saskatchewan
Marysburg Assumption Church
St. Brigitte Roman Catholic Church

See also
List of Roman Catholic dioceses in Canada

References

External links
Canadian Mass Times

 
Lists of churches in Canada
Canada